Kyal Kalay Yae Kaung Kin is a 2019 Burmese drama television series. It aired on MRTV-4, from July 2 to 29, 2019, on Mondays to Fridays at 20:45 for 22 episodes.

Cast

Main
 Kyaw Htet Zaw as Min Tain Yan
 Poe Kyar Phyu Khin as Chit Pan Eain
 Khant Si Thu as Ti Kyi Khant
 May Kabyar as Phyu Phyu Aung
 Nyein Su Wai (child cast) as Pauk Si

Supporting
 Wai Yan Kyaw as Ar Luu
 May Sue Maung as Ka Kyo
 Phyo Eaindra Min as Phyo Phyo
 Soe Moe Kyi as A May Yu
 Zell Roland as Mr. George

References

Burmese television series
MRTV (TV network) original programming